BBC Radio 2 is a British national radio station owned and operated by the BBC. It is the most popular station in the United Kingdom with over 15 million weekly listeners. Since launching in 1967, the station broadcasts a wide range of content. The Radio 2 about page says: "With a repertoire covering more than 40 years, Radio 2 plays the widest selection of music on the radio—from classic and mainstream pop to a specialist portfolio including classical, country, folk, jazz, soul, rock 'n' roll, gospel and blues."

Programmes are broadcast on FM radio, digital radio via DAB, digital television and BBC Sounds.

According to RAJAR, the station broadcasts to a weekly audience of 14.2 million with a listening share of 15.5% as of December 2022.

History

1967–1986 
The network was launched at 5:30am on Saturday 30 September 1967, replacing the BBC Light Programme — with some of the Light Programme's music shows transferring to the newly launched BBC Radio 1. The first show had started on both Radio 1 and Radio 2 but continued with Breakfast Special presented by Paul Hollingdale as Radio 1 separated at 7am. The first record played on Radio 2 was the title track to the 1965 film The Sound of Music.

In early years, much programming and music was common to both stations, particularly on the shared FM frequency. Radio 1 was targeted at the audience of pirate radio stations whereas Radio 2 settled down as a middle of the road station playing laid-back pop and rock, folk and country, jazz and big-band music, easy listening, light classical music, and oldies, with significant amounts of comedy and sport.

Notable broadcasters on Radio 2 in the 1970s and 1980s were Tom Edwards and Ray Moore who both presented the early breakfast show, Terry Wogan on breakfast, replaced by Ken Bruce and later Derek Jameson; Jimmy Young and his lunchtime current affairs show; David Hamilton on mid-afternoons and John Dunn at what became known as drivetime. In its early years, the station  as the Light Programme had done  played a large amount of specially-recorded music because of needle time restrictions imposed by the Musicians' Union.

On 6 January 1975, broadcasting hours for Radio 2 were reduced due to budget cuts at the BBC. The 5am – 2am schedule was scaled back to a 6am start-up from Mondays to Saturdays, and 6:55am on Sundays. The station closed down at around 12:30am each day. However, from 29 September 1975, the closedown was brought forward to 12:10am on weekdays and 12:33am on Saturdays and Sundays. There were exceptions, especially over Christmas and New Year periods, when hours would be temporarily extended. The pre-1975 schedule was reinstated on 1 April 1978. On 23 November 1978, the station moved from long wave to medium wave.

On 27 January 1979, Radio 2 became the first national 24-hour radio station in the UK. In the first half of the 1980s, presenters such as Kenny Everett, David Hamilton and Steve Jones increasingly featured more contemporary pop music in their playlists.

Frances Line: 1986–1996 
In response to the controversy these changes had caused in some circles, Frances Line, head of music, repositioned the station in April 1986. She would become controller in 1990.

An ageing Radio 1 audience which had grown up with the station was sticking with it into their 40s and beyond; Line repositioned Radio 2 to appeal exclusively to the over-50s, introduced older presenters and based the playlist around nostalgia, easy listening and light music.

As a result, David Hamilton quit the station at the end of 1986, claiming the music policy had become "geriatric"; Terry Wogan's replacement Derek Jameson also appealed to an older, down-market demographic. Although popular with its target audience, the policy alienated many younger listeners who had listened to both Radio 1 and Radio 2 and the station's audience fell.

The station lost its medium wave frequencies in 1990 following the launch of BBC Radio 5, and BBC Radio's sports coverage moved from Radio 2 to the new station at the same time. Also around this time, album-rock commercial stations (particularly Virgin Radio) and "gold" spinoffs from Independent Local Radio stations formed, playing classic pop and rock. With the station's audience in decline, a change of emphasis was needed.

In 1992, the weekday daytime music policy was slightly adjusted with pre-1950 music primarily confined to Sundays, and the network's playlist of light classical music was reduced following the launch of Classic FM. Radio 2's profile was boosted by the return of Terry Wogan at the start of 1993, but following the generational shift at Radio 1, commercial radio had taken the highest share of the national audience by the mid-1990s.

James Moir "The Nation's Favourite" – 1996 onwards 
Line was replaced by James Moir in 1996. Moir repositioned Radio 2 with a largely AOR/contemporary playlist by day, aimed at a more mature audience than Radio 1 (which, post-Britpop, was again starting to focus on a young audience) but still embracing new music, and more specialist broadcasting by recognised genre experts in the evenings.

Unlike the early-1990s repositioning of Radio 1, in which the BBC lost many well-known names, many former Radio 1 presenters stayed with the corporation and moved across to Radio 2.

Radio 2 has the highest listening figures of any station in the UK, its schedule filled with broadcasters such as Steve Wright, Tony Blackburn, Sara Cox, Jeremy Vine, Mark Radcliffe, Trevor Nelson, 
Jo Whiley, Paul Gambaccini, Gary Davies, Zoe Ball, Johnnie Walker and Bob Harris.

As well as having most listeners nationally, it ranks first in many regions above local radio stations. BBC Radio 2 played to 27% of the available audience in 2006.

In February 2007, Radio 2 recruited Jeff Smith, director of UK and International programming at Napster and a former head of music at Radio 1, as its new head of music. Smith joined the network on 26 March.

In the first quarter of 2011, Radio 2 was part of an efficiency review conducted by John Myers. His role, according to Andrew Harrison, the chief executive of RadioCentre, was "to identify both areas of best practice and possible savings."

On 29 July 2013, Radio 2 changed its "sonic logo" for the first time in 15 years, replacing the one composed by US jingle company Groove Worx with a new seven-note melody composed by British composer and producer Jem Godfrey. This coincided with the launch of a new jingle package produced by Godfrey in association with Wisebuddah Productions, marking Radio 2's second new package in as many years.

Radio 2 has run several "pop-up" DAB services to cover special events, the first being BBC Radio 2 Eurovision, providing coverage of the Eurovision Song Contest 2014. The station returned in 2015 for coverage of that year's contest. Others include BBC Radio 2 Country covering the C2C: Country to Country festival and BBC Radio 2 50s, a service dedicated to music programmes covering the 1950s.

During 2018, Radio 2 had numerous presenter reshuffles. In May, long-time drivetime host Simon Mayo was joined by evening DJ Jo Whiley in a new format. The move proved unpopular with listeners, and by October 2018, Mayo announced his intention to leave the station, later adding that this was so he could help launch the new classical music radio station Scala Radio in March 2019, and would continue his Radio 5 Live film review programme. Mayo and Whiley's last show together was broadcast on 20 December 2018, while Whiley moved back to her evening slot, with Mayo's final show on Radio 2 broadcast on 21 December. Sara Cox was later announced as the new drivetime host, starting on 14 January 2019.

In September 2018, Chris Evans announced that he was leaving The Radio 2 Breakfast Show and the network where he had worked since 2010 to join Virgin Radio. He was replaced by former Radio 1 Breakfast DJ Zoe Ball on 14 January 2019.

In 2022, the station announced that their annual music festival Radio 2 Live in Hyde Park would not be returning to London's Hyde Park in 2022, but would take place over two days at Leeds' Temple Newsam Park with acts such as Kaiser Chiefs, Simple Minds and the station's Kitchen Disco presenter Sophie Ellis-Bextor appearing, but it was cancelled due to the death and state funeral of Elizabeth II.

Current position 
The station's audience is now primarily adults over the age of 35 (82% of listeners) although in recent years it has attracted more younger listeners. Its daytime playlist features music from the 1960s to various current chart hits, album and indie music. The station's appeal is broad and deep, with accessible daytime programmes and specialist programmes of particular types or eras of music. In 2009, Radio 2 again won the Music Week Award for National Radio Station of the Year, an award it won for several consecutive years.

Weekday evenings have historically featured specialist music, including jazz, folk, blues, country, reggae, classic rock, show tunes and biographies and documentaries on musical artists and genres. Previously, this specialist programming ran from 20:00–midnight, but now runs only from 21:00–22:00. Radio 2 hosts both the BBC Concert Orchestra and the BBC Big Band.

Sounds of the 60s remains a regular fixture on the Saturday schedule, as does Johnnie Walker's Sounds of the 70s on Sundays. On 5 October 2013, these two shows were joined by Sounds of the 80s, which was originally hosted by Sara Cox and broadcast on Friday from 22:00–midnight. In May 2018 Gary Davies took over this show, with Cox was hosting a live 22:00 to midnight slot from Monday–Thursday, until she moved to drivetime on 14 January 2019. As part of a schedule change in July 2022, Sounds of the 80s moved back to Saturday evenings from 20:00-22:00.

On Sundays, the schedule reverts closer to its old style, with a focus on easy listening and show tunes, with programmes like Elaine Paige on Sunday and Sunday Night Is Music Night.

Radio 2 does not broadcast complete works of classical music or offer in-depth discussion or drama, although some book readings, comedy and arts coverage still remains on the station. Jeremy Vine's weekday lunchtime show covers current and consumer affairs in an informal manner, a style pioneered by Jimmy Young. Until the launch of Radio 5 in August 1990, Radio 2's medium wave frequencies carried the majority of BBC Radio's sports coverage.

Like all domestic BBC radio stations, Radio 2 is funded by the television licence fee and does not carry advertising.

The Greenwich Time Signal (also known as "the pips") is broadcast at 07:00, 08:00 and 17:00 on weekdays, 07:00 and 08:00 on Saturdays, and 08:00 and 09:00 on Sundays.

Radio 2 moved its studios from Broadcasting House to the adjacent Western House (renamed Wogan House in 2016) in 2006. Although the majority of programming comes from London, some shows are broadcast from other cities around the UK, including Birmingham and Manchester. For many years, the network's overnight presenters, such as Janice Long and Alex Lester, were based in Birmingham, but made the move to London in April 2008. Since May 2018, the weekday overnight show, now presented by OJ Borg has been broadcast from Salford, in Greater Manchester.

in November 2022 the BBC confirmed plans for BBC Radio 2 and BBC 6 Music to move out of their current home at Wogan House, and will move into studios at the nearby BBC Broadcasting House in London. The move is expected to be completed by the spring of 2024.

Radio 2 broadcasts news bulletins every hour (except for Saturdays at 23:00 and Sundays at 21:00) from a studio in Wogan House. Headline updates are on the half-hour from 05:30 - 08:30 on weekdays during the early and main Breakfast Show.

Bulletins are normally of three minutes duration. Extended five minute bulletins are broadcast on weekdays at 06:00, 07:00, 08:00, 13:00 and 17:00, on Saturdays at 07:00 and 08:00 and on Sundays at 06:00, 07:00, 08:00 and 09:00.

Current presenters 

 Michael Ball
 Zoe Ball
 Rob Beckett
 Tony Blackburn
 OJ Borg
 Kate Bottley
 Rylan Clark
 Fearne Cotton
 Sara Cox
 Jamie Cullum
 Gary Davies
 DJ Spoony
 Sophie Ellis-Bextor
 Owain Wyn Evans
 Paul Gambaccini
 Angela Griffin
 Bob Harris
 Vernon Kay
 Cerys Matthews
 Scott Mills
 Jason Mohammad
 Trevor Nelson
 Dermot O'Leary
 Elaine Paige
 Mark Radcliffe
 Romesh Ranganathan
 Liza Tarbuck
 Jeremy Vine
 Michelle Visage
 Johnnie Walker
 Jo Whiley
 Phil Williams
 Claudia Winkleman
 Steve Wright

Stand-in presenters 
These presenters do not have permanent slots on Radio 2 but have sat in for shows on the network. The list does not include regularly scheduled presenters who also stand in for other shows.

 Edith Bowman (sits in for Sara Cox, Jo Whiley and Sounds of the 80s with Gary Davies)
 YolanDa Brown (sits in for Jo Whiley)
 Nicki Chapman (sits in for The Zoe Ball Breakfast Show, Sara Cox, Liza Tarbuck, Dermot O'Leary, Claudia Winkleman, The Michael Ball Show and Steve Wright's Sunday Love Songs)
 Tina Daheley (sits in for Jeremy Vine)
 Cat Deeley (sits in for Rylan on Saturday)
 Stacey Dooley (sits in for Claudia Winkleman)
 Chris Hawkins (sits in for OJ Borg and Good Morning Sunday)
 Alex Jones (sits in for The Michael Ball Show and Claudia Winkleman)
 Gethin Jones (sits in for Dermot O'Leary)
 Preeya Kalidas (sits in for OJ Borg)
 Shaun Keaveny (sits in for Liza Tarbuck and The Rock Show with Johnnie Walker)
 Gabby Logan (sits in for The Michael Ball Show)
 Judi Love (sits in for Rob Beckett)
 Joe Lycett  (sits in for Sara Cox)
 Davina McCall (sits in for Claudia Winkleman)
 Paddy O'Connell (sits in for Jeremy Vine and Rob Beckett)
 Sam Pinkham (sits in for OJ Borg,)
 Anita Rani (sits in for Sara Cox, Scott Mills, Dermot O'Leary, Claudia Winkleman and Rylan on Saturday)
 Adele Roberts (sits in for Trevor Nelson's Rhythm Nation and Jo Whiley)
 Gaby Roslin (sits in for The Zoe Ball Breakfast Show and Steve Wright's Sunday Love Songs)
 Jessie Ware (sits in for Jo Whiley)
 Will Young (sits in for Jo Whiley)

Travel presenters 

 Richie Anderson (weekday mornings) 
 Bobbie Pryor (weekday afternoons)
 Sally Boazman (weekends)
 Orna Merchant (weekends)
 Jules Lang (stand-in)
 Ellie Brennan (stand-in)

Regular contributors 
Those listed below, regularly appear on shows as contributors but don't present a programme themselves.
 Sarah Jarvis (medical expert, on Jeremy Vine's show) 
 James King (Film critic, on Jo Whiley's show - alternate Tuesdays)
 Martin Lewis (financial expert, on Jeremy Vine's show)
 Phil Swern (Producer and regular contributor on Sounds of the 60s)

Notable former presenters 

 Paul Hollingdale (1967–1970)
 Pat Doody (1967–1971)
 Eric Robinson (1967–1971)
 Kenneth Alwyn (1967–1972)
 Barry Alldis (1967–1973)
 Simon Bates (1973–1976)
 David Gell (1967–1977)
 Robin Richmond (1969–1980)
 Sam Costa (1967–1981)
 Alberto Semprini (1967–1982)
 Kenny Everett (1981–1983)
 Tom Edwards (1968–1984)
 Pete Murray (1967–1984)
 Tony Brandon (1970–1985)
 Steve Jones (1979–1985)
 David Hamilton (1967–1973; 1975–1986)
 Ray Moore (1967–1988)
 Stuart Hall (1982–1988)
 Peter Dickson (1983–1989 plus one week as a stand-in in 1999)
 Billy Butler (1988–1990)
 Simon Dee (1988–1990)
 Peter Clayton (1970–1991)
 Teddy Johnson (1967–1992)
 Keith Fordyce (1969–1992)
 Judith Chalmers (1990–1992)
 Graham Knight (1988–1991)
 Bill Rennells (1978–1993)
 Anne Robinson (1988–1993, stand-in for Jimmy Young in 1996)
 John Sachs (1991–1993)
 Barbara Sturgeon (1992–1993)
 Adrian Love (1987–1994)
 Charlie Chester (1968–1995)
 Alan Dell (1967–1995)
 Gloria Hunniford (1981–1995)
 Katie Boyle (1968–1996)
 Wally Whyton (1969–1996)
 Martin Kelner (1984–1996)
 Chris Stuart (1985–1996)
 Derek Jameson (1985–1997, with wife Ellen from 1992 to 1997)
 Angela Rippon (1985–1997, stand-in presenter)
 Robbie Vincent (1997 only)
 Debbie Thrower (1995–1998)
 John Dunn (1967–1998)
 Benny Green (1967–1998)
 Steve Madden (1985–1998)
 Bob Holness (1968–1974, 1985–1998)
 Charles Nove (1981–2012)
 David Allan (1968–1999)
 Pam Ayres (1996–1999)
 Des Lynam (1970–1980, 1998–1999)
 Jackie Bird (1998–2000)
 Alan Freeman (1997–2000)
 Cliff Adams (1967–2001)
 Jack Docherty (2000–2001)
 Katrina Leskanich (1998–2000)
 Sheila Tracy (1977–2000)
 Sir Jimmy Young (1973–2002)
 Andy Peebles (1998–2002)
 Alan Keith (1970–2003)
 Sybil Ruscoe (2003–2004)
 Don Maclean (1990–2006)
 Brian Hayes (1991–2006)
 Sheridan Morley (1990–2006)
 Richard Baker (1986–2007)
 Nick Barraclough (1992–2007)
 Canon Roger Royle (1984–2007)
 Russell Brand (2006–2008)
 Humphrey Lyttelton (1967–2008)
 Matthew Wright (2006–2008)
 Michael Aspel (1968–1974, 1986–1999, 2009)
 Jon Briggs (newsreader and continuity) (1996–2009)
 Mo Dutta (1995–2009)
 Bob Dylan (2007–2009)
 Malcolm Laycock (1995–2009)
 Pete Mitchell (2006–2009)
 Jonny Saunders (former drivetime and weekday breakfast sports reporter) (2006–2011)
 Emma Forbes (2009–2010)
 Sarah Kennedy (1976–1983, 1993–2010)
 Mark Lamarr (1998–2010)
 Jonathan Ross (1999–2010, 2014–2018)
 Suzi Quatro (2008–2010)
 Dale Winton (2000–2010)
 Steve Harley (2000–2008)
 Michael Parkinson (1996–2007, 2011)
 Alan Titchmarsh (2006–2011)
 Colin Berry (1973–2012)
 Melanie Sykes (2010–2012)
 Brian D'Arcy (2007–2012)
 Mike Harding (1997–2012)
 Aled Jones (2006–2012)
 David Jacobs (1967–2013)
 Steve Lamacq (2007–2013)
 Stuart Maconie (1998–2013)
 Lynn Parsons (1998–2014)
 Fran Godfrey (newsreader) (1990–2014)
 Dave Pearce (2011–2014)
 Richard Allinson (1997–2014)
 Alan Dedicoat (newsreader) (1986–2015)
 Rebecca Pike (business news reporter) (2006–2015)
 Ed Stewart (1980–1983, 1991–2006, 2007–2015)
 Sir Terry Wogan (1972–1984, 1993–2015)
 Desmond Carrington (1981–2016)
 Janice Long (1999–2017)
 Alex Lester (1987–2017)
 Brian Matthew (1967–2017)
 Diane-Louise Jordan (2012–2017)
 Clare Balding (2013–2017)
 Lynn Bowles (travel, weekday mornings) (2000–2018)
 Paul Jones (1986–2018)
 Rachel Horne (travel, weekday mornings) (March–December 2018) 
 Matt Williams (Drivetime Sport reporter) (2010–2018)
 Nigel Ogden (1980–2018)
 Frank Renton (1995–2018)
 Moira Stuart (newsreader, weekday breakfast) (2010–2018) 
 Simon Mayo (2001–2018)
 Chris Evans (2005–2018) 
 Vassos Alexander (Breakfast Sport reporter) (2011–2018) 
 Carol Kirkwood (2012–2019) (breakfast show weather presenter)
 Don Black (2013–2020)
 Bill Kenwright (2010-2020)
 Graham Norton (2010–2020)
 Clare Teal (2006–2021)
 Huey Morgan (2011–2021)
 Anneka Rice (2012–2021)
 Angela Scanlon (2018–2021)
 Dr Rangan Chatterjee (2021–2022) 
 Craig Charles (2014–2022) 
 Ana Matronic (2014–2022) 
 Paul O'Grady (2009-2022) 
 Vanessa Feltz (2011–2022)
 Janey Lee Grace (1999-2022)
 Tim Smith (1999-2022)
 Ricky Wilson (2021-2022 with a regular series, also a stand-in presenter)
Ken Bruce (1984-2023, previously a stand in presenter, 1980-83)

Controllers/Head of Station

Controversies 
Presenter Sarah Kennedy attracted controversy before she left the station in 2010. In May 1999, she gave a "bizarre" performance while standing in for Terry Wogan, blaming the incident on a lack of sleep the previous night. Her slurred speech throughout her show on 13 August 2007 also made the headlines. She blamed a sore throat and later took a month-long break. It was later reported that Kennedy was recovering from pneumonia, and she returned to work on 10 September. In October 2007, she was reprimanded after joking that she had almost run over a black pedestrian because she could not see him in the dark. The BBC later apologised for the comment. She was also "spoken to" by BBC bosses after praising Enoch Powell during a show in July 2009, describing him as "the best prime minister this country never had".

On 16 October 2008, an episode of The Russell Brand Show, co-hosted by fellow Radio 2 presenter Jonathan Ross was recorded for transmission at a later date. The show included Russell Brand and Ross leaving four prank messages on actor Andrew Sachs' answerphone, including offensive remarks about his granddaughter and use of foul language. The programme was subsequently broadcast on 18 Octoberpartially censoredhaving passed the various pre-transmission checks from the programme's editors. Initially, the programme only received a negligible number of complaints regarding Ross' bad language; however, the incident was reported a week later by The Mail on Sunday and a public outcry soon ensued. The case was referred to both Ofcom and the BBC Trust, and in the interim, Ross and Brand were both suspended for 12 weeks from all BBC programmes pending investigation. Soon after these announcements, Brand announced his resignation from the BBC, shortly followed by the controller at the time, Lesley Douglas. Ross was suspended from the BBC without pay for 12 weeks.

In July 2009, longtime presenter Malcolm Laycock announced his resignation live on air following a long-running dispute over the content of his show, Sunday Night at 10, and issues regarding his salary.

On 9 August 2022, Paul O’Grady quit his Sunday afternoon show after 14 years, making public that he was not happy with a schedule change which saw Rob Beckett fill his slot for thirteen weeks before O’Grady was scheduled to come back. The two presenters would have switched over again once another thirteen weeks was over. On 1 July 2022, Steve Wright announced that Steve Wright in the Afternoon would be coming to an end after 23 years on the station. Shortly afterwards, the BBC announced that Scott Mills would join to present a new afternoon show, replacing Wright. This received wide backlash over the fact that Wright's removal from the station's daytime line up was not of his own volition and due to concerns that Mills' show would be too similar to its previous iteration on BBC Radio 1, made evident by the music selection on his new show.

References

External links 

 
 
 

 
Adult contemporary radio stations in the United Kingdom
2
Radio stations established in 1967
Radio stations in the United Kingdom
1967 establishments in the United Kingdom